Roger Tahull Compte (born 11 May 1997) is a water polo player from Spain. He was part of the Spanish team at the 2016 Summer Olympics, where the team finished in seventh place.

See also
 List of World Aquatics Championships medalists in water polo

References

External links
 

Spanish male water polo players
Living people
1997 births
Olympic water polo players of Spain
Water polo players at the 2016 Summer Olympics
Competitors at the 2018 Mediterranean Games
Water polo players from Barcelona
Mediterranean Games competitors for Spain
Water polo players at the 2020 Summer Olympics
World Aquatics Championships medalists in water polo
21st-century Spanish people